The administrative division of Somaliland are organized into three hierarchical levels. consists of 6 regions and 22 districts. Districts in turn contain villages. In addition, the capital Hargeisa has its own law (capital law) that is different from the law that defines administrative divisions. The administrative-territorial division of the country is established by the Law of Somaliland No. 23/2002, which was finally approved in 2007.

Somaliland is a self-declared  unrecognized sovereign state in the Horn of Africa, internationally considered to be part of Somalia.

History
Before March 21, 2008, the Somaliland government continued to use the six administrative regions covered by Somalia at the time of unification: Awdal, Waqooyi Gelbeed, Sanaag, Sool, Togdheer, Sahil. On March 22 of the same year, President  Dahir Riyale Kahin issued the "Presidential Press Statement", announcing the establishment of 6 new administrative districts and 16 sub-districts from the original administrative divisions. On May 15 of the same year, the President announced the establishment of the 13th administrative district. In June 2014, Somaliland President Ahmed Mohamed Mohamoud announced the establishment of a 14th administrative district and 4 sub-districts. The new administrative district called Haysimo is composed of Sur and Sanaq in the east. However, the administrative divisions established by the two presidents were not approved by the Parliament.

First-level divisions

According to the 2019 Local Government Act, Somaliland is divided into six regions. The territory of the region is based on British Somaliland and State of Somaliland administrative divisions, not Union-era.

Second-level divisions 

There are 22 districts. under the state. Each district is rated A, B, C, and D according to population, budget, and economic scale. The highest is A grade. The district where the state capital is located is always Class A (Article 9 of the Local Government Law). The region with the most districts is Awdal, Sool and conversely the region with the fewest is Sahil.

See also
Regions of Somaliland
Districts of Somaliland
Somalia–Somaliland border

References

 
Somaliland
Somaliland
Somaliland geography-related lists
Somaliland